San Andrés is a corregimiento in Bugaba District, Chiriquí Province, Panama. Its population as of 1990 was 2,451; its population as of 2000 was 2,526.

References

Corregimientos of Chiriquí Province